The Rucker-Mason Farm is a historic farmhouse in Cannon County, Tennessee, U.S.. It was built circa 1800 for Gideon Rucker. It was acquired by his brother, Bennett Rucker, in 1817. By 1840, he owned 14 slaves. The farm remained in the Rucker family until 1902.

The house was first designed in the Federal architectural style circa 1800. A Greek Revival portico was built circa 1840. It has been listed on the National Register of Historic Places since January 9, 2007.

References

Houses on the National Register of Historic Places in Tennessee
Federal architecture in Tennessee
Greek Revival architecture in Tennessee
Houses completed in 1800
National Register of Historic Places in Cannon County, Tennessee